VA-154 was an Attack Squadron of the U.S. Navy. It was established as Bombing Squadron VB-153 on 26 March 1945, redesignated as VA-15A on 15 November 1946, and finally designated as VA-154 on 15 July 1948. In October 1945, the squadron participated in a 1,200-plane flyover of New York City in honor of Navy Day. The squadron was disestablished on 1 December 1949.

Home port assignments
The squadron was assigned to these home ports, effective on the dates shown:
 NAAS Manteo – 26 Mar 1945
 NAS Wildwood – 07 Apr 1945
 NAAS Oceana – 31 May 1945
 NAS Norfolk – Jul 1946
 NAS Alameda – 07 Aug 1946

Aircraft assignment
The squadron first received the following aircraft on the dates shown:
 SB2C-4E Helldiver – Apr 1945
 SB2C-5 Helldiver – Jun 1945
 AD-2 Skyraider – 08 Jul 1948

See also
 List of squadrons in the Dictionary of American Naval Aviation Squadrons
 Attack aircraft
 List of inactive United States Navy aircraft squadrons
 History of the United States Navy

References

External links

Attack squadrons of the United States Navy
Wikipedia articles incorporating text from the Dictionary of American Naval Aviation Squadrons